U.F.O.F. is the third studio album by the American band Big Thief, released through 4AD on May 3, 2019.

The album was recorded in June 2018 at Bear Creek Studio, a secluded studio with lush nature surroundings in Woodinville, Washington. The songs "From" and "Terminal Paradise" previously appeared in a different form on Adrianne Lenker's 2018 solo album Abysskiss. The title initials stand for "UFO friend", according to lyrics in the title track. The album received acclaim from music critics and was nominated for Best Alternative Music Album at the 62nd Annual Grammy Awards.

Five months after the album's release, Big Thief released their fourth studio album, Two Hands. Described as the "earth twin" to U.F.O.F., it was recorded at Sonic Ranch in the Chihuahuan Desert of Texas days after the band completed recording for U.F.O.F. in Washington.

Critical reception 

U.F.O.F. received critical acclaim upon release. On Metacritic, which uses a normalized rating from music critics, the album holds a score of 87 out of 100 based on 24 reviews, indicating "universal acclaim".

The album was named "Best New Music" by Pitchfork, with a score of 9.2/10 and the website calling the album the band's "undoubtedly best" and "a mesmerizing flood of life filtered down into a concentrated drip." In 2020, AllMusic listed U.F.O.F. as one of the best albums of 2010s.

Track listing

Personnel
Credits adapted from the album's liner notes.

Big Thief
 Adrianne Lenker – acoustic guitar (1–7, 9, 10), electric guitar (1, 5, 8, 9, 11), vocals (all tracks), choir (2, 4, 5, 8), SK5 (2, 10), piano (3), chimes (5), breath (8), percussion (8), ambience (12)
 Buck Meek – electric guitar (1–5, 7–10), clap (4), choir (4), vocals (7, 10), feedback (11), ambience (12)
 James Krivchenia – drums (1–5, 7–11), percussion (2), choir (2, 4, 5), SK5 (2), magic box (4, 5, 8), chimes (5), breath (8), Moog (8), tambourine (9), vocals (11), drum fill (12), ambience (12)
 Max Oleartchik – bass (1, 2, 4, 5, 7–12), bass drone (1–3, 8, 10), choir (2, 4), piano (3), bells (4), breath (8), shaker (8), ambience (12)

Additional musicians
 Zoë Lenker – choir (4)
 Andrew Sarlo – wind (9), ambience (12)
 Dom Monks – ambience (12)

Technical
 Dom Monks – engineering, mixing
 Andrew Sarlo – production
 Greg Calbi – mastering
 Taylor Carroll – assistant engineering, "studio brain"

Artwork
 Dustin Condren – cover photography
 Sarah Schiesser – design, layout
 Alison Fielding – production design

Charts

References

4AD albums
2019 albums
Big Thief albums
Albums recorded at Bear Creek Studio
Dream pop albums by American artists
Art rock albums by American artists